Briahna Joy Gray (born August 15, 1985) is an American political commentator, lawyer, and political consultant who served as the National Press Secretary for the Bernie Sanders 2020 presidential campaign. Gray is a contributing editor for Current Affairs, and was a senior politics editor for The Intercept. She hosts her own podcast, Bad Faith, and co-hosts The Hill's web series Rising.

Early life and education 
Briahna Joy Gray was born on August 15, 1985, in Washington, D.C., to Reuben Gray and Leslie Fair-Gray, both of whom were teachers. Although initially raised in North Carolina, Gray spent time in Saudi Arabia and Kenya while her parents taught at international schools in those countries. In February 2001, while driving in Nairobi, Gray's father sustained fatal injuries in a car accident involving an American diplomat.

Gray earned a Bachelor of Arts degree from Harvard University and a Juris Doctor from Harvard Law School.

Career 
After graduating from law school, Gray worked as a corporate litigator in New York City for Dewey Pegno & Kramarsky LLP and Stroock & Stroock & Lavan. She was also the host of Someone’s Wrong on the Internet, a podcast that covers politics and pop culture. Gray was hired by The Intercept in 2018, and has also written columns for Rolling Stone, Current Affairs, The Guardian, and New York Magazine.
Gray supported Bernie Sanders 2016 presidential campaign and joined his 2020 campaign as his National Press Secretary. Gray has stated that she voted for Jill Stein in the 2016 presidential election.

In 2020, Gray was included in Fortune magazine's '40 Under 40' listing under the "Government and Politics" category. On April 13, 2020, after Bernie Sanders dropped out of the 2020 Democratic Party presidential primary, Gray stated on Twitter that she did not endorse the presumptive Democratic presidential nominee Joe Biden. In response, Bernie Sanders distanced himself from her saying that "She is my former press secretary — not on the payroll." 

Since Sanders' 2020 Democratic primary campaign ended, Gray returned to her role as contributing editor at Current Affairs in addition to co-hosting the Bad Faith podcast with former Chapo Trap House co-host Virgil Texas.

References

External links

Bad Faith podcast

Living people
21st-century American journalists
21st-century American women lawyers
21st-century American lawyers
African-American journalists
African-American lawyers
African-American women in politics
African-American women journalists
African-American women lawyers
American podcasters
American political activists
American women in politics
American women podcasters
Bernie Sanders 2020 presidential campaign
Harvard Law School alumni
Left-wing politics in the United States
1985 births
Harvard College alumni